The Shiki or Sigeu (Japanese シキ, Korean 시그) class railcars were a class of 3rd class steam railcars of the Chosen Government Railway (Sentetsu). There were two classes of such railcars, one built in Japan and one built in the United Kingdom.

Shiki1 class (シキ1)
In 1923, Kisha Seizō of Japan built four steam railcars for Sentetsu, which were essentially a small tank steam locomotive with a 2-2-0 wheel arrangement built onto one end of a passenger carriage. Intended for use for commuter trains on the Gyeongin Line, the railcar pulled two passenger cars in active service. However, performance was far from satisfactory, with many complaints about excessive vibration being received. As a result, in 1924, after barely a year in service, one was scrapped, and the remaining three were converted to 2-2-0 tank locomotives by removing the integrated passenger compartment. A second one was scrapped in 1927, leaving only two locomotives. These two remained in service until at least 1940, but their subsequent fate is unknown.

Shiki2 class (シキ2)
Despite the poor experience with the first steam railcars, Sentetsu imported two geared steam railcars from Sentinel-Cammell in England in 1929. These had a vertical boiler generating superheated steam of  pressure, which fed a single, horizontally mounted, 6-cylinder engine producing , and had a lightweight body integrated with the underframe. These steam railcars later proved very helpful in designing Sentetsu's first petrol-powered railcars. Both units remained in service until at least 1940, but their subsequent fate is unknown.

References

Locomotives of Korea
Railcars of Korea
Railway locomotives introduced in 1923
Railway locomotives introduced in 1929
2-2-0 locomotives
Kisha Seizo locomotives
Sentinel locomotives
Railmotors